Metopides occipitalis is a species of beetle in the family Cerambycidae. It was described by Francis Polkinghorne Pascoe in 1866. It is known from Malaysia, Borneo, and Sumatra. It contains the varietas Metopides occipitalis var. cordatus.

References

Lamiini
Beetles described in 1866